Great Divide is a ski area located northwest of Helena in Southwestern Montana near the Continental Divide. Great Divide is a locally owned ski area that is often the first ski area in Montana to open for the season each year.

History
Mt. Belmont's first trail was built to accommodate the 1942 Northern Rocky Mountain Ski Races,  and was selected amongst other surrounding mountains including Elkhorn Peak, Red Mountain, and Mt. Edith.  The ski area was owned and operated by the non-profit Belmont Ski Club from 1941 thru much of 1985 when it was sold to the Taylor family who have developed the ski area and operated ever since.  The first chair lift, Mt. Belmont chair, was built in 1986 and went to the top of the mountain. New chairlifts have been added to mid-mountain areas and a recent expansion of the area added the Rawhide and Wild West Chairlifts.

Current operations
The mountain features one of the best terrain park areas in Montana. There is a fairly powerful snowmaking system which allows early openings and construction of all five terrain parks.  Great Divide is well known for its Terrain Parks and hosts a variety of events featuring those parks.

Great Divide starts at a base of 5,730 feet and offers more than 1600 acres of terrain. The mountain has five lifts and one rope tow that access over 140 trails covering .  There are paid and/or volunteer patrollers on duty at all times.  The area is usually closed on Mondays and Tuesdays, and offers night skiing on Fridays 4p.m. to 9p.m. Great Divide offers lessons daily from 100a.m. til 4p.m., with instruction taking place in the Backyard Beginner's Area. There is an all-mountain ski team that is a 7-week program for kids aged 7 to 19, an average of 130 kids participate each season.

Montana Skiing
Ski areas in Montana may only be open for a few days a week to begin the season, but days and hours will often expand through the winter season. Montana skiing is often popular late in the season with some areas extending lift operations to the month of April.

Location
Great Divide Ski area is just over 95 miles from Great Falls, Montana and just over 129 miles from Missoula Montana.

External links
 Great Divide Snowsports

Ski areas and resorts in Montana
Tourist attractions in Lewis and Clark County, Montana
Skiing in Montana